Reymond Clavel (born June 23, 1950) is director of the Laboratoire de Systèmes Robotiques 2 (LSRO2) at the École Polytechnique Fédérale de Lausanne in Switzerland. He is one of the pioneers in the development of parallel robots, and the inventor of the notable Delta robot. His interest in research and his teaching are related mostly to robotics, micro-robotics and high precision mechanisms. His main domains of expertise are:

 Conception of parallel and hybrid kinematics for robots and tool-machines.
 Conception of robots with high speed, high dynamics and ultra high precision.
 Conception of high precision mechanisms.
 Conception of complex medical devices.
 Virtual reality and active interfaces.

Biography
Reymond Clavel obtained his degree in mechanical engineering at the Federal Institute of Technology of Lausanne (EPFL), Switzerland, in 1973. After nine years of gathered experience in industrial plants at Hermes Precisa International (research and development), he was appointed professor at the EPFL, where he obtained his PhD degree in parallel robotics in 1991. His present research topics are parallel robotics, high speed and high precision robotics, medical and surgical robotics applications, surgical instrumentation and precision mechanisms. Reymond Clavel's research successes in parallel and industrial robotics received worldwide special mentions.

Awards

 1989: Laureate of the JIRA AWARD (Japan Industrial Robot Association) for the DELTA parallel robot invented in 1985.
 1996: Project winner of the ”Technologiestandort Schweiz” competition and “ABB Sonderpreis” for the best robotics project.
 1998: His laboratory is awarded the “Grand Prix de l’Innovation” in Monaco for new robot technologies.
 1999: Laureate of the Golden Robot Award for the DELTA Robot.
 2003: Each of his three different submitted projects received the Swiss Technology Award.
 2005: Project winner of the “Swiss Technology Award” competition with further the “Sonderpreis 2005” from the Vontobel Foundation in the field of “Inventing the future”.
 2006: Project winner of the “Swiss Technology Award” competition with “Quantum leap into world of nano-EDM” (a new high precision EDM machine based on the Delta kinematics).
 2007: Two projects based on the LSRO's researches are winner of the “Swiss Technology Award” competition: “Cyberthosis for paraplegia rehabilitation” (a collaboration with the company Swortec and the Fondation Suisse pour les Cyberthèses (FSC)) and the “Microfactory” realized in partnership with the CSEM .

References

External links

Reymond Clavel
Laboratoire de Systèmes Robotiques 2

1950 births
Living people
Swiss roboticists
Swiss mechanical engineers
Academic staff of the École Polytechnique Fédérale de Lausanne